is a Japanese footballer who playing as a forward and currently without club. He is the twin brother of fellow professional footballer Kaito Kamiya.

Career
Ryo Kamiya leave from the club in 2022 after ended contract with Kamatamare Sanuki.

Career statistics

Club
.

References

External links

1997 births
Living people
Japanese footballers
Association football forwards
Tokai Gakuen University alumni
J3 League players
Japan Football League players
Kamatamare Sanuki players
FC Kariya players